The Nokia C2-01 is a mobile phone produced by Nokia. The Nokia C2-01 supports 3G and has a 3.2 megapixel back camera. It has a single SIM card. The handset was introduced to the markets in 2011. It replaced its predecessor, the Nokia 2700 classic and Nokia 2730 classic and has improved specifications.

Features 
The Nokia C2-01 has a 3.2 megapixel back camera to capture images, as well as UMTS capabilities.
It also has Bluetooth and supports J2ME applications (MIDP 2.1). Removing or replacing the battery wipes the memory requiring the phone to be reset manually for Date, time, etc.

Specification sheet

References 

C2-01
Mobile phones introduced in 2011
Mobile phones with user-replaceable battery